Orange SPV was a series of smartphones built by HTC and Amoi for the European mobile operator, Orange.

The first HTC model was installed with Microsoft Windows Mobile 2002 and launched late 2002. SPV stood for Sound, Pictures, Video, with the emphasis being on the device's multimedia capabilities and potential. It came with a Texas Instruments OMAP710 processor which clocked in at a speed of 132 MHz. An internal memory of 16 MB RAM and 32 MB of Flash ROM was complemented with the addition of a Secure Digital storage card.

It was most notable as being the first Windows smartphone to be released and was greeted with much anticipation. The phone carried mini versions of such desktop applications as Outlook, Media Player and Internet Explorer alongside advanced calendar, task and contact management facilities, so focused on the business user segment.

Another of the main selling points of the phone at the time was the display, which had a reflective TFT screen producing 65,000 colours at 176 x 220 pixels resolution. The one drawback to all this in models before the E200 was the lack of a built in camera, something that was becoming increasingly common and popular on much less capable phones.

With a length of 11 cm, width 4.5 cm and a depth of 2 cm, it weighed just 95 g.

Various Orange SPV models were released until 2007.

Release history and specifications

References

External links 
 Orange Worldwide

HTC mobile phones
Windows Mobile Standard devices
Orange mobile phones
Amoi mobile phones